The Ichthus Festival is a Christian music festival in Wilmore, Kentucky. Held 44 times from 1970 to 2015, the event was originally a Christian-music answer to Woodstock but developed into both the longest-running Christian music festival and a Christian ministry serving tens of thousands of attendees annually.  With financial difficulties in the 2010s, the festival left Wilmore after 2012 and put on one last event in 2015 at the Kentucky Horse Park in nearby Lexington, Kentucky.  In 2021, the festival was revived in Wilmore.

History
Professor Bob Lyon was inspired by 1969's Woodstock to create a similar experience for fans of Christian music. In spring 1970, Lyon and some of his students at Asbury Theological Seminary hosted thousands at the first Ichthus Festival at Wilmore Campgrounds in Wilmore, Kentucky. Student-run for decades, the festival hired a director in 2000, and spent that decade expanding Ichthus Festival into a greater Christian ministry.

After Ichthus 2013 was cancelled due to financial problems, it was announced that the 2014 event (September 26–28) would be held at the Kentucky Horse Park in northern Fayette County, Kentucky, as part of Creation Festivals.  The dates were later changed to June 4–7 before the festival was moved to 2015 entirely (July 8–11) due to the 2013–14 North American winter causing an "unusually high number of snow days" that prevented local students from attending.  The 2015 Creation-led Ichthus Festival was that group's last, as they announced on February 4, 2016, that there would be no Ichthus 2016: "We underestimated the time and financial resources necessary to restart this great ministry. So, after much prayerful consideration, Creation Festivals has made the difficult decision that stepping away from Ichthus Festival will be in the best interest for the event and its future."

On May 6, 2016, Asbury University announced that it had obtained the rights to the Ichthus Festival name and legacy from Creation Festivals.  Fuse Ministries held a relaunch event of the Ichthus Festival on September 18, 2021, at Servant Heart Farm in Wilmore; 600–700 people attended, and the venue operators—Joe and Cheryl Lycan—said it was a success.  Fuse's festival has continued there annually through 2022.

Event

The Wilmore Campgrounds hosted Ichthus Festivals through 1998.  Starting in 1999, the festival was held at Ichthus Farm, a  parcel bought specifically for the festival.  Fuse Ministries' September 2021 event was scheduled at "Servant Heart Farm in Wilmore, KY [, ...] the location of the festival from 1999 to 2012." The farm was sold and renamed in 2013.  From 2021 through 2022, the festival has been held at Joe and Cheryl Lycan's Servant Heart Farm at 9517 Harrodsburg Road in Wilmore.

For many years, the event was annually scheduled for the last full weekend in April—which in the Bluegrass region meant foul weather: "Ichthus had enough soggy, stormy weekends [...] that it earned nicknames such as Mudthus and Ickythus."  In 2005, the festival saw snow, leading then-executive director Jeff James to move the weekend into June, saying, "It's better to be wet and warm than wet and cold."  In 2008, an all-inclusive weekend ticket cost .

In 1991, the festival saw 11,500 attendees; eight years later that number was 18,000.  As of 2009, the five-day, three-stage Ichthus Festival was still attracting 17–20,000 attendees and upwards of 100 musicians and speakers; by 2012, it was the longest-continually-running Christian music festival.  When relaunched in 2021 by Fuse Ministries, the festival had 600–700 attendees.

Acts

 7eventh Time Down
 AD
 Altar Boys
 The Awakening
 BarlowGirl
 Big Tent Revival
 Bleach
 Rick Bonfim
 Burlap to Cashmere
 Steven Curtis Chapman
 The City Harmonic
 Andraé Crouch
 David Crowder Band
 DC Talk
 DeGarmo and Key
 GRITS
 Israel Houghton
 The Imperials
 Jars of Clay
 Phil Keaggy
 Mylon LeFevre
 Hawk Nelson
 New World
 Newsboys
 Larry Norman
 Out of Eden
 Charlie Peacock
 Petra
 The Rainbeaux
 Relient K
 Resurrection Band
 Ron and Bill Moore
 Sanctus Real
 Skillet
 Michael W. Smith
 Switchfoot
 TobyMac
 Chris Tomlin
 Twenty One Pilots
 White Heart

References

External links
 

1970 establishments in Kentucky
Asbury Theological Seminary
Christian missions
Christian music festivals
Christianity in Kentucky
music festivals established in 1970
music festivals in Kentucky